Greninger is a surname. Notable people with the surname include:

 Alden Buchanan Greninger (1907–1998), namesake of the Greninger chart
 Alexander Greninger, American virologist